The National Research University "Belgorod State University" (BelSU) (Russian: Белгородский государственный национальный исследовательский университет (НИУ БелГУ)) is a university in Belgorod, Russia. Belgorod State University is one of the oldest universities in Belgorod and the largest university in the Belgorod region. The university has 25,000 students from 85 regions of Russia, 1800 foreign students from 76 countries, 72 institutions and faculty, 2 branches, 98 departments and 74 research centers and laboratories.

History 
On September 26, 1876 in the district town of Belgorod, the Teacher's Training Institute – the ninth of that kind in Russia – was founded by the order of the Russian Ministry of Public Education.

On June 4, 1919 Belgorod Teacher's Training Institute was reorganized into Belgorod Pedagogical Institute by the order of the People's Commissariat for Education of the RSFSR, and in 1920 it was reorganized into Belgorod Institute of Public Education.

In 1922 Belgorod Institute of Public Education was reorganized into Belgorod Practical Institute of Public Education, which was reordered into the Pedagogical Secondary School in September, 1923.

In 1939 it became the Teacher's Training Institute again.

The university had to temporarily suspend its operation in 1941 due to the outbreak of World War II and resumed its work only when the area had been completely liberated from fascists – in 1944, but in a new place – the town of Stary Oskol (Belgorod region) because Belgorod came out of war almost totally destroyed.

Since 1957, the university has been located in Belgorod. Nowadays the university has several campuses in and out of the city.

In the early 2000s, the university complex began to develop and expand fast due to new buildings with modern equipment. The number of students over the last 7 years has grown more than three times.

University Today 
 23 thousand students from all regions of Russia;
 More than 2500 foreign students from 80 countries;
 18 Joint Educational Projects with top universities of Europe, Asia-Pacific Region;
 3 Bachelor's and master's degree programs in English;
 Over 160 agreements for international cooperation;
 14 Associates and Members of Russian Academy of Sciences;
 Over 1112 Doctors and Candidates of Science;
 7 Institutes, 3 Faculties, Medical College, 1 branch;
 Co-operational agreements for internship with more than 800 enterprises;
 19 core sub-departments and 103 sub-departments;
In 2009, Belgorod State University was selected along with other 27 finalists of the national competition of higher education institutions development programs to be awarded the category of national research university.

In 2009, the university became the base institution of The Shanghai Cooperation Organization (SCO) Network University, in the priority areas of Nanotechnology, Regional Studies and Ecology.

On April 26, 2010, following the secret voting, the Contest Committee of the Ministry of Education and Science of the Russian Federation selected the universities to be awarded the title of national research university. It was the second round involving  the best of the best – 32 Russian universities out of 128 university-applicants. Only 15 out of those 32 universities became the winners, Belgorod State being one of them. Over five years the university received 2 billion rubles of federal funding, which allowed the university to complete the projects within some research programs, to build a new dormitory for 1,000 residents and an 80-apartment house for young scientists.

In 2012, BelSU joined the rank of the 30 best national universities, following a study of 103 Russian state universities and 500 branches. 
As of the end of 2013, all the major indicators of another stage of the National Research University Program were reached, by which the university proved its national research university status and effectiveness.

In 2012 and 2014, BelSU won in the competitions of development programs for students’ associations. Successful implementation of the programs along with the federal financial support amounting to about 55 million rubles encouraged the development of the BelSU Students’ Union and helped the student self-government to move to a new high-quality level in various fields of the university's life.

Belgorod State University consists of several campuses. The central campus includes 8 academic buildings, a research library, a publishing house, a museum of BelSU history, a university newspaper editorial office, a Career Counseling Center, Youth Cultural Center, a dormitory, an apartment block for university faculty, St. Gabriel's University Church and an administrative building. This campus provides facilities for professional training of future lawyers, philologists, translators, biologists, chemists, doctors, pharmacists, journalists, geologists, geographers, managers, economists, and programmers.

All the buildings of the central campus were built at the beginning of the 20th century.

The campus of the Faculty of Theology and Social Sciences is located in the renovated building of the former His Royal Highness the Duke of Edinburgh's men's classical school. The building is an original monument of eclectic architecture and is under protection of the state. The apartment block for faculty, put in operation in 2010, is located nearby.
Yet another university campus houses classrooms, research laboratories, Distance Learning Center, 5 dormitories, Burevestnik (shearwater) Sport Complex, Center of Preclinical and Clinical study, and BelSU Clinic. Academic facilities on this campus are mostly used by future school teachers of Russian and Foreign languages, Physics and Mathematics, History, Primary school and Fine arts, Physical culture, as well as speech therapists and psychologists.

Research centres and laboratories 
Today BelSU is home to 23,000 students from all regions of Russia and 80 countries of the world. The university offers programs for specialists, bachelors and masters in 349 fields of studies and majors, as well as 26 areas of training and 349 educational programs for PhD students and those pursuing the Doctor of Science degree. In the university, there are 17 Scientific Dissertation Councils. The fundamental and applied research is carried out in 50 areas. The university has nine educational and research innovation complexes; 50 research centers and laboratories, including:
 21 research and educational centers;
 26 research centers and research laboratories;
 3 common use centers of scientific equipment;
 BelSU High-tech Solutions Tech Park with a business incubator;

In 2015, on the basis of BelSU there was established the Regional Microbiological Center

The Youth Cultural Center at BelSU houses 16 amateur art groups for students.
The university library system includes 11 reading rooms (including three rooms with open access to the Library collection), 9 lending libraries, and over 1.2 million items in the Library collection.
The university has 9 museums: Museum of BelSU History; Museum of Forensic Science, Museum of Zoology, Museum of Forensic Medical Examination, Museum of the Faculty of History and Philology, Museum of the Department of Mining and Natural Resources Management, Museum of the Institute of Pedagogy, Museum of the International Office, and N. Strakhov Library and Museum. Besides, the university has the University Clinic, the Equestrian School, the Botanical Garden and Nezhegol  Recreational Complex.

The Botanical Garden is a unique educational and scientific, socio-cultural and natural object. The garden collection includes more than 2,500 species and varieties. The garden area is 71 hectares.

University in rankings 
QS University Rankings: BRICS

Position 151 - 200

QS University Rankings: Top universities in Emerging Europe and Central Asia

Position 151 - 200

Round University Rankings

Position 641

Webometrics Ranking  of World Universities

Position 1777 among 11 999 universities and scientific organizations. The 20th position among 1306 Russian universities and scientific organizations.

Ranking Web of Repositories

Position 812, the 4th place among 23 Russian universities and scientific organizations

Interfax Group National University Rankings

Position 19 among 238 universities

RA Expert Ranking

Position 59 in Top-100 The Best Universities of Russia and 37th place among the best universities in "Econommics and management" sphere.

Scimago Institutions Rankings

Position 19 among Russian universities and position 653 in the world.

Student life 
The Youth Cultural Center at BelSU houses 16 amateur art groups for students. The university library system includes 11 reading rooms (including three rooms with open access to the Library collection), 9 lending libraries, and over 1.2 million items in the Library collection. The university has 9 museums: Museum of BelSU History; Museum of Forensic Science, Museum of Zoology, Museum of Forensic Medical Examination, Museum of the Faculty of History and Philology, Museum of the Department of Mining and Natural Resources Management, Museum of the Institute of Pedagogy, Museum of the International Office, and N. Strakhov Library and Museum. Besides, the university has the University Clinic, the Equestrian School, the Botanical Garden and Nezhegol Recreational Complex.

The university has a Youth Media Holding, which includes an editorial office of a youth supplement to the News of BelSU newspaper – “Nota Bene”, BelSU's (White Goose) Radio, TUT TV and  the site of the Youth Editorial Office [4]

Svetlana Khorkina Educational and Sports Complex 
Svetlana Khorkina Educational and Sports Complex
The 36.7-thousand-square-meter complex houses a 50-meter swimming pool with springboards (up to 10 meters high), an athletics arena, a universal arena, a chess club guided by Grandmaster Alexander Alexandrovich Ivanov (Belgorod), gyms, rooms for table tennis, rooms for dance and aerobics. On the campus at Studencheskaya Street there is Burevestnick (shearwater) Sport Complex.

See also
 Open access in Russia

References

External links
 Belgorod State University Home Page in English official website
 Innovations market of SRU "BSU"
 Regional Microbiological Center

Educational institutions established in 1876
Belgorod
Universities in Russia
National research universities in Russia
Buildings and structures in Belgorod Oblast
1876 establishments in the Russian Empire